This is a list of association football clubs located in Kenya. For a complete list, see :Category:Football clubs in Kenya

Active teams

A
Administration Police
Admiral F.C.
A.F.C. Leopards
Agrochemical F.C.
Ascend F.C.

B
Bandari F.C. (Kenya)
Bacca F.C. (Kenya)
Bidco United F.C.
Busia United Stars F.C.

C
Chemelil Sugar F.C.
Coast Stars F.C.
Chania 237 F.Cf

D
Dagoretti Santos

F
Finlays Horticulture A.F.C.

G
G.F.C. 105
Gor Mahia F.C.
Gusii Shabana F.C.
Githurai sharks F.C

H
Homegrown F.C.

I
Iron Strikers F.C.
ipc Roysambu F.C.
Isebania F.C.

K
Kariobangi Sharks
Kakamega Homeboyz F.C.
Kangemi United F.C.
Karuturi Sports
Kenya Commercial Bank S.C.
Kenya Pipeline F.C.
Kisumu All Stars F.C.
Kenya School of Law
Kea Green Stars F.C.
Kibera A2Z F.C

L
Ligi Ndogo S.C.

M
Mahakama F.C.
Mathare United F.C.
Mathare Youth F.C.
Meru City FC
Ministry of Sports, Culture and the Arts
Modern Coast Rangers F.C.
Mombasa Sports Club
Muhoroni Youth F.C.
Mombasa Hamlets F.C
Mombasa Eagles Football Club
MUSOKOTO FC.

N
Nairobi City Stars
Nairobi Stima F.C.
Nakumatt F.C.
Nakuru Top Fry AllStars
Nzoia United F.C.

O
Oserian F.C.

P
Posta Rangers F.C.

R
Real Kisumu F.C.
Red Berets F.C.
Reunion F.C.
Rift Valley United F.C.
Raymond F.C.

S
Sofapaka F.C.
Sony Sugar F.C.
St. Joseph F.C.
Sunderland AFC Keroche
SHOFCO UNITED Kibera
Shabana FC

T
Talanta
Thika United F.C.
Timsales F.C.
Tusker F.C.
Thika Sporting club

U
Ulinzi Stars F.C.
Utawala F.C.
Sindo United

W
Wazito F.C.
West Kenya Sugar F.C.
Western Stima F.C.
West Ham

Y
Yanga F.C.

Z
Zoo Kericho F.C.
 Zaka Sports Club

Women's clubs 

 Vihiga Queens FC
 Thika Queens FC

Defunct teams

F
Feisal F.C.

M
Mumias Sugar F.C.

N
Nakuru AllStars (1961)
Nairobi Heroes F.C.

R
Rivatex F.C.

U
Utalii

References

 
Kenya
Football clubs
Football clubs